Parc Logístic is a Barcelona Metro station, in the Zona Franca district of Barcelona. The station is served by line L9.

The station is located underneath the intersection of Avinguda Parc Logístic and the carrer de Número Vint i Cinc. There are two entrances at the same intersection, which serve a below ground ticket hall.

The station was opened in 2016, at the time of the extension of line L9 from Zona Universitaria station to Aeroport T1 station.

References

External links
Trenscat.com

Barcelona Metro line 9 stations
Railway stations in Spain opened in 2016